Bereshit or Bereishith is the first word both of the Jewish Torah, and of the Christian New Testament of John, which alludes to the Torah. It is typically translated as "In the beginning...", and may refer to:
In the beginning (phrase)
Book of Genesis
Bereshit (parashah), the first weekly Torah portion in the annual Jewish cycle of Torah reading
 Beresheet and Beresheet 2, both lunar landers by SpaceIL
 "Bereishit", a song by Blue Fringe
 "Berashith", a 1902 essay by Aleister Crowley

See also
Bereshit Rabbah, the midrash about the Book of Genesis
Maaseh Breishit and Maaseh Merkavah, the esoteric doctrine of the universe or parts of it